Divera Maria Koedooder (born 31 October 1983) is a Dutch former professional racing cyclist.

Born in Hoorn, Koedooder was a member of the Dutch team that finished sixth at the 2012 Summer Olympics in the team pursuit (together with Ellen van Dijk, Kirsten Wild and Amy Pieters).

Career achievements

Major results

Road

2000
 1st  Time trial, National Junior Road Championships
2001
 1st  Time trial, National Junior Road Championships
 8th Road race, UCI Junior Road World Championships
2002
 1st Stage 3 GP Boekel
 3rd Time trial, National Road Championships
 3rd Grand Prix de Dottignies
 10th Overall Holland Ladies Tour
2003
 1st Flevotour
 3rd  Road race, UEC European Under-23 Road Championships
 3rd Ronde van Gelderland
2005
 1st Flevotour
2006
 1st Brasschaat/Maria-ter-Heide 1000 euro Race
 2nd Omloop van Borsele
2007
 1st Parel van de Veluwe
2008
 3rd Holland Hills Classic
 7th Overall Ster Zeeuwsche Eilanden
 7th Omloop van Borsele
2009
 6th Chrono Champenois
 8th Overall Ster Zeeuwsche Eilanden
2010
 4th Overall Tour de Feminin-O cenu Českého Švýcarska
 5th Overall Ster Zeeuwsche Eilanden
 7th Holland Hills Classic
2011
 4th Overall Ster Zeeuwsche Eilanden
 8th Omloop van Borsele
2012
 1st Stage 2 (TTT) Trophée d'Or Féminin
 5th Overall Tour de Feminin-O cenu Českého Švýcarska
 8th Overall Ster Zeeuwsche Eilanden
2013
 1st Team time trial, National Road Championships (with Aafke Eshuis, Julia Soek and Ilona Hoeksma)
 1st Ronde van Barendrecht
 1st Kermisronde van Bergeijk
 1st Grand Prix de Dottignies
 1st EPZ Omloop van Borsele
 2nd Profronde van Stiphout
 2nd Parel van de Veluwe
 3rd Draai van de Kaai
 8th 7-Dorpenomloop Aalburg
 10th Overall Tour de Bretagne Féminin
1st Stage 2 (ITT)
2014
 2nd Overall Energiewacht Tour
1st Stage 3a
 2nd Nagrada Ljubljane TT
 3rd Overall Tour de Feminin-O cenu Českého Švýcarska
 3rd Gent–Wevelgem
 7th Overall BeNe Ladies Tour
 9th 7-Dorpenomloop Aalburg
2015
 2nd Parel van de Veluwe
2016
 2nd Omloop van de IJsseldelta

Track

2000
 1st  Points race, UCI Junior Track Cycling World Championships
2001
 1st  Individual pursuit, UCI Juniors Track World Championships
2002
 1st  Points race, UEC European Under-23 Track Championships
2003
 UCI Track Cycling World Cup Classics, Aguascalientes
2nd  Team sprint
3rd  Points race
 3rd Scratch, National Track Championships
2004
 3rd Scratch, National Track Championships
2006
 1st  Scratch, 2006–07 UCI Track Cycling World Cup Classics, Sydney
 National Track Championships
1st  Individual pursuit
3rd Points race
 1st  Individual pursuit, National Junior Track Championships
2008
 National Track Championships
1st  Points race
3rd Individual pursuit
2009
 National Track Championships
1st  Madison (with Kirsten Wild)
2nd Individual pursuit
 2008–09 UCI Track Cycling World Cup Classics, Copenhagen
2nd  Scratch
2nd  Team pursuit
 3rd  Individual pursuit, 2009–10 UCI Track Cycling World Cup Classics, Manchester
2010
 1st  Scratch, 2009–10 UCI Track Cycling World Cup Classics, Beijing
 National Track Championships
2nd Omnium
2nd Madison (with Ellen van Dijk)
3rd Individual pursuit
2011
 3rd Madison, National Track Championships (with Winanda Spoor)
2012
 3rd Points race, National Track Championships
 6th Team pursuit, Olympic Games (with Ellen van Dijk, Amy Pieters and Kirsten Wild)
2015
 National Track Championships
1st  Points race
3rd Madison (with Roxane Knetemann)

National records

Koedooder was six times part of the 3000 m team pursuit squad when they established a new Dutch national record.

See also

 List of Dutch Olympic cyclists

References

External links

1983 births
Living people
Dutch female cyclists
People from Hoorn
Cyclists at the 2012 Summer Olympics
Olympic cyclists of the Netherlands
Dutch cyclists at the UCI Track Cycling World Championships
Cyclists from North Holland
20th-century Dutch women
21st-century Dutch women